Szentes is a district in north-eastern part of Csongrád County. Szentes is also the name of the town where the district seat is found. The district is located in the Southern Great Plain Statistical Region.

Geography 
Szentes District borders with Kunszentmárton District (Jász-Nagykun-Szolnok County) and Szarvas District (Békés County) to the north, Orosháza District (Békés County) to the east, Hódmezővásárhely District to the south, Csongrád District to the west. The number of the inhabited places in Szentes District is 8.

Municipalities 
The district has 1 town, 2 large villages and 5 villages.
(ordered by population, as of 1 January 2012)

The bolded municipality is city, italics municipalities are large villages.

Demographics

In 2011, it had a population of 41,328 and the population density was 51/km².

Ethnicity
Besides the Hungarian majority, the main minorities are the Roma (approx. 600) and German (150).

Total population (2011 census): 41,328
Ethnic groups (2011 census): Identified themselves: 36,753 persons:
Hungarians: 35,631 (96.95%)
Gypsies: 569 (1.55%)
Others and indefinable: 553 (1.50%)
Approx. 4,500 persons in Szentes District did not declare their ethnic group at the 2011 census.

Religion
Religious adherence in the county according to 2011 census:

Catholic – 11,572 (Roman Catholic – 11,493; Greek Catholic – 73);
Reformed – 4,964;
Evangelical – 413;
Orthodox – 41;
other religions – 293; 
Non-religious – 12,244; 
Atheism – 614;
Undeclared – 11,187.

Gallery

See also
List of cities and towns of Hungary

References

External links
 Postal codes of the Szentes District

Districts in Csongrád-Csanád County